Tony Volpentest is a paralympic athlete from the United States competing mainly in category T44 sprint events.

Tony competed at three paralympics for the United States team winning four gold medals and a silver medal.  His first games were in the 1992 Summer Paralympics where he broke the world record in the 100m and 200m and was part of the United States 4 × 100 m relay team that finished 0.02 seconds behind the world record setting Australians.  At the 1996 Summer Paralympics he again competed in the 100m and 200m and defended both titles with another world record in the 100m.  At the 2000 Summer Paralympics he finished fourth in the 100m but was unable to finish the 200m heats.
 Italian american, his great-grandparents came from Ripabottoni.

References

External links 
 

Paralympic track and field athletes of the United States
Athletes (track and field) at the 1992 Summer Paralympics
Athletes (track and field) at the 1996 Summer Paralympics
Athletes (track and field) at the 2000 Summer Paralympics
Paralympic gold medalists for the United States
Paralympic silver medalists for the United States
American male sprinters
Living people
Year of birth missing (living people)
American people of Italian descent
Medalists at the 1992 Summer Paralympics
Medalists at the 1996 Summer Paralympics
Paralympic medalists in athletics (track and field)
Sprinters with limb difference
Paralympic sprinters